Friedrich Nikolaus Bischoff (also known as Fritz Bischoff, born 6 December 1905, date of death unknown) was a German sailor who competed in the 1936 Summer Olympics.

References

External links
 
 
 

1905 births
Year of death missing
German male sailors (sport)
Olympic sailors of Germany
Sailors at the 1936 Summer Olympics – 8 Metre
Olympic bronze medalists for Germany
Olympic medalists in sailing
Medalists at the 1936 Summer Olympics